Marco Blume is one of the most successful professional Magic: The Gathering players. He has won two Pro Tours and one Masters as a member of team Phoenix Foundation, his teammates being Kai Budde and Dirk Baberowski. He also won a German individually national championship in 1999. Blume is currently the Head of Sportsbook at Pinnacle Sports.

Top 8 appearances

References 

Year of birth missing (living people)
Living people
German Magic: The Gathering players
Sportspeople from Hamburg
Businesspeople from Hamburg
German gamblers
Bookmakers